World Series Baseball 2K2, or World Series Baseball as it is known for Xbox, is a sports game developed by Visual Concepts and published by Sega for the Dreamcast and Xbox. It is the first game in the modern series to be featured on the Xbox and the first title in the series developed by Visual Concepts. It is the successor to the World Series Baseball series for the Sega Genesis, Sega Saturn, and Sega Dreamcast. It was released in 2001 to coincide with the beginning of the 2002 baseball season.

The game and the rest of the 2K titles on the Dreamcast have had their online components revived and are completely playable online.

Gameplay
World Series Baseball consists of many game modes and features. The game modes are Play Now, Season, Franchise,  and Create-A-Player. Jason Giambi is on the cover of the game.

Some new features updated from the Dreamcast version is in-depth trading and a 15- and 60-day Disabled List. In the new franchise mode there is a Management Draft, Rookie Draft, and a Free Agent Signing Period. Create-A-Player is also highly updated from the last version.

The online component of the Dreamcast version was brought back online by Shuouma on March 1, 2018 with plans to bring back other Sega sports in the near future as well.

Reception

The Xbox version received "favorable" reviews, while the Dreamcast version received "average" reviews, according to the review aggregation website Metacritic. Maxim gave the latter console version a negative review, a few weeks before its release Stateside. However, Jim Preston of NextGen called the same console version "A vast improvement over the original with only a few shortcomings to mar the outing." In Japan, Famitsu gave it a score of 25 out of 40.

References

External links
 
 

2001 video games
Dreamcast games
World Series Baseball video games
Sega video games
Video games developed in the United States
Xbox games